This list of tallest buildings in Sofia ranks buildings in the Bulgarian capital city Sofia by height.

Completed buildings

Tallest buildings under construction

Tallest proposed buildings

References

See also
List of tallest buildings in Bulgaria
List of tallest structures in Bulgaria
List of tallest buildings in Europe
List of tallest buildings in the European Union

Tallest
Tallest